Pahari painting (literally   meaning a painting from the mountainous regions: pahar means a mountain in Hindi) is an umbrella term used for a form of Indian painting, done mostly in miniature forms, originating from Himalayan hill kingdoms of North India, during 17th-19th century, notably Basohli, Mankot, Nurpur, Chamba, Kangra, Guler, Mandi and Garhwal.  Nainsukh was a famous master of the mid-18th century, followed by his family workshop for another two generations. The central theme of Pahari painting is depiction of eternal love of Hindu deities Radha and Krishna.

Origin and area
The Pahari school developed and flourished during 17th-19th centuries stretching from Jammu to Garhwal, in the sub-Himalayan India, through Himachal Pradesh. Each created stark variations within the genre, ranging from bold intense Basohli Painting, originating from Basohli in Jammu and Kashmir, to the delicate and lyrical Kangra paintings, which became synonymous to the style before other schools of paintings developed, and finally to the poetic and cinematic representations in Garhwali Paintings by Mola Ram.  The Kangra style reached its pinnacle with paintings of Radha and Krishna, inspired by Jayadeva's Gita Govinda.

Pahari painting grew out of the Mughal painting, though this was patronized mostly by the Rajput kings who ruled many parts of the region, and gave birth to a new idiom in Indian painting. Some local antecedents have also been suggested, as a vivid Kashmiri tradition of mural paintings flourished between the 9th and 17th centuries, as seen in the murals of Alchi Monastery or Tsaparang.

Schools of Pahari painting
 Guler School
 Kangra School
 Chamba School
 Garhwal School
 Bilaspur, Himachal Pradesh

Famous examples
 Krishna and Radha in a Pavilion

Gallery

See also 

 Sikh art and culture

Further reading
 Pahari Masters: Court Painters of Northern India by B. N. Goswamy and Eberhard Fischer Artibus Asiae. Supplementum, Vol. 38, Pahari Masters: Court Painters of Northern India (1992), pp. 3–391. 
 Wall Paintings of The Western Himalayas, by Mira Seth. Publications Division. 1976.
 Garhwal Paintings, by Mukandi Lal. Publications Division. 1982.
 Punjab Painting - Study in Art and Culture, by R P Srivastava. Abhinav Publications. 1983. .
 Centres of Pahari Painting, by Chandramani Singh. Published by Abhinav Publications, 1982. .
 Portfolio - The Bhagavata Paintings from Mankot, by Karl Khandalavala. Lalit Kala Akademi. 1981.
 On the origins of Pahari Painting, by Vishwa Chander Ohri,  Joseph Jacobs. Indian Institute of Advanced Study. 1991. .
 Nainsukh of Guler: A Great Indian Painter from a Small Hill-state by B.N. Goswamy. Niyogi Books. 2011.
 Nala and Damayanti: A Great Series of Paintings of an Old Indian Romance''. Niyogi Books. 1st Edition. 2015.

References

Further reading
 Kossak, Steven. (1997). Indian court painting, 16th-19th century. Metropolitan Museum of Art.

External links
 
 Indian Court Painting, 16th-19th Century from the Metropolitan Museum of Art

Himalayan art
Schools of Indian painting
Culture of Uttarakhand
Culture of Himachal Pradesh
Culture of Jammu and Kashmir